The Russia national football B team, also known as the Russia-2 national football team, is a secondary team for Russia in association football. The team is controlled by the Russian Football Union. It was founded in 2011. In late 2012, after Sergei Fursenko was replaced by Nikolai Tolstykh as the president of the Russian Football Union, the team was dismantled, at least for the immediate future.

On 28 February 2022, due to the 2022 Russian invasion of Ukraine and in accordance with a recommendation by the International Olympic Committee (IOC), FIFA and UEFA suspended the participation of Russia, including in the Qatar 2022 World Cup. The Russian Football Union unsuccessfully appealed the FIFA and UEFA bans to the Court of Arbitration for Sport, which upheld the bans.

Results

Last squad  
This is the squad called up for a friendly game on 9 September 2012 against Turkey A2.

Caps and goals correct as of 9 September 2012 after the Turkey A2 game.

|-----
! colspan="9" bgcolor="#B0D3FB" align="left" |
|----- bgcolor="#DFEDFD"

|-----
! colspan="9" bgcolor="#B0D3FB" align="left" |
|----- bgcolor="#DFEDFD"

|-----
! colspan="9" bgcolor="#B0D3FB" align="left" |
|----- bgcolor="#DFEDFD"

Previous call-ups
These players have been called up for the team in the last 12 months.

Managers
Yuri Krasnozhan (4 July 2011 – 26 Oct 2012)

References

External links

European national B association football teams
B
2011 establishments in Russia
2012 disestablishments in Russia